"Scarlet Fever" is a song written by Mike Dekle, and recorded by American country music artist Kenny Rogers.  It was released in June 1983 as the third single from the album We've Got Tonight.  The song reached number 94 on the Billboard Hot 100 chart in mid-1983.  The song peaked at number 5 on the country chart.

Chart performance

References

1983 singles
1983 songs
Kenny Rogers songs
Liberty Records singles